Shurnukh is a village in the Goris Municipality of the Syunik Province in Armenia.

The village is located on the Armenia-Azerbaijan border. Following the end of the 2020 Nagorno-Karabakh war and the withdrawal of Armenian forces from the adjacent Qubadli District of Azerbaijan, a small part of the village, including 12 houses, was determined to be part of the Qubadli District and fell under the control of Azerbaijan.

The village had an Turkish-majority population prior to 1989, when the Azerbaijani inhabitants fled as a result of the Nagorno-Karabakh conflict, after which the village was repopulated by Armenians who fled from Azerbaijan.

History
Shurnukh is first mentioned in Stephen Orbelian's 13th-century work History of the Province of Sisakan as Shornokho, located in the Baghk (or Kashunik) canton of the Syunik province of historic Greater Armenia. According to one theory, the name of the village comes from Old Armenian and originally had the meaning of “running water, a place of running water, a damp area.”

The date of the destruction of the historic village is unknown; however, it is known that there were ruins at its site at the end of the 19th century, including remnants of a church. According to census figures from the Tsarist era, 84 people listed as Muslims had settled on the ruins by 1897. The site is again abandoned in 1919 and 1922, but populated by Azerbaijanis (referred to as Turks in the first Soviet census) by 1926.

The modern village was founded in 1930 on the site of the ruins of the historic village. In Soviet times, the village council also included the nearby villages of Aghbulagh and Vanand (now both uninhabited) and a settlement attached to a woodworking factory.

Geography 
Shurnukh is located on a scenic, thickly forested mountainside near the River Shurnukh, a small tributary of the Vorotan. It is located on the Goris-Kapan road.

Demographics
According to Zaven Korkotyan, the village was uninhabited from 1831 to 1886. It was then populated by Azerbaijanis; 84 in 1897, 117 in 1904, 104 in 1914. It is listed as an uninhabited ruin in 1919 and 1922. There were 101 Azerbaijanis living in the village in 1926, and 123 Azerbaijanis, 7 Armenians and 2 Russians in 1931. According to Syunyats Yerkir magazine, Shurnukh was populated by Azerbaijanis from 1930 to 1989 and from 1990 the village was repopulated by Armenians. According to the Dictionary of Republic of Armenia Settlements, Shurnukh's population consisted of 351 residents in 1939, 363 in 1959 and 1970, 324 in 1979, 148 in 2001 and 197 in 2004. The community's population increased to 224 in 2010, but reduced to 207 people in the 2011 census. In 2016, the population was recorded as 153 people.

Sights 
In the late 2010s, an iron cross was erected on the hill in the centre of the village. The cross lights up in the night.

Border dispute
On 24 December 2020, Shurnukh village head Hakob Arshakyan said that Azerbaijanis were in Shurnukh negotiating with a representative of the Armenian National Security Service and Russian border guards. The Azerbaijani representatives demanded that the Armenian side cede twelve houses located on the eastern side of the Goris-Kapan road to Azerbaijan which, according to Soviet-era maps, fall in the Qubadli District of Azerbaijan bordering Armenia's Syunik Province. Most of Qubadli District was captured by Azerbaijani forces during 2020 Nagorno-Karabakh War, and the remaining parts still under Armenian control were transferred to Azerbaijan according to unwritten provisions of the trilateral agreement which ended the war. Further demarcation according to the administrative borders of the Soviet era raised tensions among the villagers living close to the border and residents of Syunik in general. On December 21 residents of Syunik blocked roads to prevent Prime Minister Nikol Pashinyan from entering the region. The 12 houses were ceded to Azerbaijan on 4 January 2021. There is no frontier post yet, just a small sign, and people can cross freely between parts of the village.

On January 9, the Armenian government announced that it would build 12 new houses in the village to compensate the villagers whose homes came under the control of Azerbaijan. In February 2021, the government announced a compensation package of 300,000 Armenian drams (about US$577) as a single payment followed by a monthly payment of 68,000 Armenian drams (about US$130) for six months, and the start of the construction of a new residential block to provide permanent accommodation to those villagers who lost their homes.

Gallery

References 

Populated places in Syunik Province
Former Azerbaijani inhabited settlements